Alexander Yakovlevich Davydov (Russian: Александр Яковлевич Давыдов; Kureika, 11 June 1917 – 1987) was a Soviet Red Army major and an illegitimate child of Joseph Stalin.

Biography 
Stalin resided in the Siberian village of Kureika during his exile. Here he had an affair with 14-year-old Lidiya Platonovna Pereprygina. At the age of 16, she gave birth to Alexander. Stalin went out of exile and left Siberia before he was born. Pereprygina later married Yakov Semyonovich Davydov, who adopted Alexander. Stalin knew of his son's existence and allegedly tried twice to bring him to Moscow. However, they never met.

World War II 
Davydov was drafted into the Red Army in August 1940. He fought in the Manchurian Campaign against the Japanese between March and August 1945. He achieved the rank of major.

DNA research 
Alexander Davydov's son, Yuri Davydov, had his DNA tested in 2016.  Alexander Burdonsky, another grandson of Stalin, made his DNA available for this purpose. The research confirmed genetic kinship with Joseph Stalin.

Awards and honors 

 Order of the Red Star
 Medal "For Battle Merit"
 Medal "For the Victory over Japan"

References

External links 

 “Давыдов Александр Яковлевич” at Pamyat-naroda.ru

1917 births
1987 deaths
Soviet military personnel of World War II
Russian people of World War II